Towson University's College of Graduate Studies and Research administers graduate programs leading to master's and doctoral degrees and advanced certificates.

The college recruits and admits graduate students, maintains graduate student records, monitors academic progress, and clears students for graduation. The college provides institutional infrastructure to faculty as they seek and secure grant and contract funds to support research in individual disciplines. The College of Graduate Studies and Research took its name in 2005.

References

External links
College of Graduate Studies and Research - Towson University Website

Graduate Studies and Research